"Let Me into Your Heart" is a song written and recorded by American country music artist Mary Chapin Carpenter. It was released in September 1996 as the first single from the album A Place in the World.  The song reached number 11 on the Billboard Hot Country Singles & Tracks chart and number 5 on the RPM Country Tracks in Canada.

Music video
The music video was directed by Steven Goldmann and premiered in September 1996 and featured guest Bill Irwin as the romantic interest.

Chart performance
"Let Me into Your Heart" debuted at number 64 on the U.S. Billboard Hot Country Singles & Tracks for the week of October 5, 1996.

References

1996 singles
Mary Chapin Carpenter songs
Songs written by Mary Chapin Carpenter
Columbia Records singles
Music videos directed by Steven Goldmann
1996 songs